Never Say Die is a 1988 New Zealand action comedy starring Temuera Morrison and Lisa Eilbacher. It was written and directed by Geoff Murphy.

Plot
Both Alf and his wife Melissa have returned home to New Zealand after being homesick.  After a delay in customs that irritates Alf, the two return to their old home which has just had the utilities switched back on.  As they arrive the house is destroyed in a gas explosion.  Paranoid Alf goes to report his suspicions that the explosion was deliberate to his nemesis on the New Zealand Police, Inspector Evans.  Evans thinks Alf is upset and imagining things.  Alf later survives a car crash where his brakes were cut, however an examination of Alf's car lead Evans to believe that shrapnel from the house explosion cut the brake line.

Alf and Melissa escape to a country house on Waiheke Island where Alf's increasing paranoia leads him to establish a line of tripwires around the property that drop noise making kitchen utensils.  Alf also arms himself with a small bore rabbit hunting rifle.  They are joined by a hunter who eschews shooting bunnies and instead shoots at Lisa until Alf kills him with his rifle.  Evans still thinks Alf is paranoid but is mystified as the unzeroed sights on Alf's weapon and its small calibre makes Alf's one shot one kill of the hunter a remote possibility. After fleeing to the West Coast of the South Island where Alf and Melissa are followed, and a helicopter drops two assassins with fully automatic weapons who destroy the property where they are staying, Evans starts to believe Alf. This leads to a cross country chase across New Zealand, featuring nonstop car chases, assassination attempts and continuous references to 007. Alf and Melissa eventually make their way back to Auckland Airport where a meetup with Melissa's father's lawyer (who recently died) reveals the true intentions of the assassination attempts and who the real culprit is.

Cast
 Temuera Morrison as Alf Winters
 Lisa Eilbacher as Melissa Jones
 George Wendt as Mr. Witten
 Tony Barry as Detective Inspector Evans
 John Clarke as Car salesman
 Geoff Murphy as Jack
 Elizabeth McRae as Daisy
 Jay Laga'aia as Bruce (cop)

Morrison and McRae would work again together in 1992 on the TVNZ series Shortland Street.
Several cast members (notably, Barry and Murphy himself) had appeared in Murphy's earlier film, Goodbye Pork Pie.

Music, soundtrack and media
The song "Never Say Die" sung by Bunny Walters is featured during the closing credits. It is composed and performed by Billy Kristian. Other songs include "Get Outta Here" performed by Susan Lynch and Jacqui Fitzgerald, composed by Kristian and Geoff Murphy. "Never Say Die" and "Gotta Get Outta Here" are the A & B sides of the single released on WEA Z10002, released the same year. "007 Down She Goes" is performed by Nigel Lee, and written by Murray Grindlay.

The film was released on VHS and is now out of print. It has never been released on DVD, but was released to purchase via digital download in 2022.

References

External links 
 

New Zealand action comedy films
1980s New Zealand films
1988 films
1988 action films
1980s spy films
Films directed by Geoff Murphy
Political thriller films
Films shot in New Zealand
1980s action comedy films
1980s political films
Films set in New Zealand
1988 comedy films
1980s English-language films